Ognyana Georgieva Petrova – Ognyana Dusheva (née Petkova, born December 20, 1964 in Svilengrad) is a Bulgarian sprint canoer who competed from 1976 to 1988. Petrova won a bronze medal in the K-4 500 m event at the 1988 Summer Olympics in Seoul.'

Petrova started her sports career in Plovdiv with “Trakia” Sports Club of canoe-kayak in 1976. From 1981 to 1988, she was part of the Bulgarian national team, consistently being on the six-person team at the European and World Championships. She won the K-2 500 m bronze medal at the 1987 World Championships in Duisburg, West Germany.

Petrova was nominated as one of Bulgaria's ten-best women sprint canoers in the 20th century. She also won an Olympic service medal by the Bulgarian Olympic Committee and was awarded the emblem of Plovdiv by the city's mayor. Petrova also acts as a Judge for the International Canoe Federation and serves as the PR of the Bulgarian Canoe Federation.

References

Australian Broadcasting Corporation profile
DatabaseOlympics.com profile

External links
Sports-reference.com profile

1964 births
Bulgarian female canoeists
Canoeists at the 1988 Summer Olympics
Living people
Olympic canoeists of Bulgaria
Olympic bronze medalists for Bulgaria
Olympic medalists in canoeing
ICF Canoe Sprint World Championships medalists in kayak
People from Svilengrad
Medalists at the 1988 Summer Olympics
Sportspeople from Haskovo Province